Slavic-speakers inhabiting the Ottoman-ruled region of Macedonia had settled in the area since the Slavic migrations during the Middle Ages and formed a distinct ethnolinguistic group. While Greek was spoken in the urban centers and in a coastal zone in the south of the region, Slav-speakers were abundant in its rural hinterland and were predominantly occupied in agriculture. Habitually known and identifying as "Bulgarian" on account of their language, they also considered themselves as "Rum", members of the community of Orthodox Christians.

After the emergence of rival national movements among Balkan Christians, the allegiance of Macedonian Slavs became the apple of discord for nationalists vying for dominion over the region of Macedonia. Parties with national affiliations, mostly Greek and Bulgarian, were formed in their midst, largely expressing and accentuating pre-existing social cleavages. From the 1870s onwards Bulgarian and Greek propaganda appealed to them via the creation and operation of national education networks and by supporting the structures of the Bulgarian Exarchate or the Patriarchate of Constantinople respectively. Amidst worsening economic and political conditions for Slav peasants, the clandestine Internal Macedonian Revolutionary Organization, founded in 1893, gained a wide following with a program of agrarian reform imposed by terror, culminating in the staging of the Ilinden uprising of 1903, which was swiftly suppressed by the Ottomans. An armed clash ensued within Slav communities resistant to national proselytization, with IMRO komitadjis fighting against Ottoman authorities and bands of Greek and Serbian nationalists until the pacification imposed after the Young Turk Revolution in 1908. At that time the international observers viewed the majority of them as Bulgarian.

Following the partition of the Ottoman lands of the region of Macedonia between Balkan nation-states after the conclusion of the Balkan Wars in 1913, many Slavic-speaking inhabitants of the regions annexed by Greece and the Kingdom of Serbia emigrated to Pirin Macedonia and other parts of Bulgaria.

Language, economy, and society 

In the region of Macedonia, Greek-speakers were concentrated in a littoral zone, covering the southern parts of contemporary Greek Macedonia, southwards of the cities of Kastoria, Edessa, and Serres. To the north of this imaginary line, Greek was spoken regularly in the cities, while in the countryside most Christians were Slav-speakers. From the mid-eighteenth till the mid-nineteenth century Greek-, Vlach- and Albanian-speakers migrated under Albanian pressure from Epirus to Macedonia, forming new villages or settling in Slav-speaking existing ones, and were linguistically assimilated in most cases. Slavic-speakers, predominating in the rural parts of the region, laboured in Turkish chifliks in the plains or inhabited free mountainous villages and worked as itinerant specialized craftsmen, e.g. builders, across the Balkan peninsula. Only a few populated the region's urban centers, until the growing stream of migration from the countryside to the cities over the nineteenth century. As happened in the case of Vlachs, Slavs migrants to the cities usually adopted Greek culture and were married into other groups of Orthodox Christians.

At the beginning of the nineteenth century, Slav peasants identified themselves based on belonging to their family, village, or local region or as "Rum", i.e. members of the Rum millet, the Greek-dominated politico-religious community of Orthodox Christians. The Slavs of Macedonia generally referred to themselves and were known as "Bulgarians". The word "Bulgar" invoked the idea of a poor, Slav-speaking peasant, the stereotypical negative image of the labourers of lowland chiftliks as dull and uncivilized. As it described their actual socio-economic status, the term "Bulgar" could be used as a term of identification in tandem with "Rum", which denoted membership in the community of Orthodox Christians and implied the aspiration of elevation to the higher social status of cultured Hellenized urbanites.

By the early years of the nineteenth century, peasant communities of Macedonia experienced the formation of deep divisions between various social and professional groups over the appointment of community leaders and the allocation of natural resources.

National antagonisms

During the Greek War of Independence two revolts erupted in southern Macedonia with considerable peasant support. In 1821 an insurrection under the leadership of monks of Mount Athos had limited success and only two groups of villages from the Chalkidiki peninsula were involved in it. The insurrection of Naousa, Imathia the next year, led by local notables and warlords, was joined by ca 2,000 Greek- and Slav-speakers from the surrounding villages. Both uprisings were characterized by the absence of concrete planning and demands from the revolutionaries, other than a desire for freedom and putting an end to Muslim rule, and were suppressed in a short time. A considerable number of Slavs from Macedonia, amounting to a few hundreds, continued fighting, imbued with religious sentiment, in southern Greece as professional soldiers and settled in the independent kingdom of Greece, where they were given land. Their descendants were called "Bulgarians" or "Thracian-Macedonians," and were considered Bulgarian-speaking Orthodox Christian co-nationals on a par with Greek-speaking Greeks, as they perceived themselves.

While Greeks claimed the Slavs of Macedonia as their Orthodox brethren, Serbs and Bulgarians considered them members of their nation on account of their language. Maps and statistics produced mostly reflected their creators' intentions than the demographic reality on the ground, while Ottoman censuses classified their subjects using their religious affiliation further perplexed the issue of their national identity. Rival Serb, Greek and Bulgarian nationalism used religious and educational institutions to tie Macedonia's population to their respective national cause. While a vibrant minority of schoolteachers, priests, and government officials readily espoused national causes, that was not the case with the vast majority of Slav peasants. Alignment of the Slavs of Macedonia with the Bulgarian, the Greek or sometimes the Serbian national camp did not imply adherence to different national ideologies: these camps were not stable, culturally distinct groups, but parties with national affiliations, described by contemporaries as "sides", "wings", "parties" or "political clubs". The Exarchist movement met with less success in Macedonia than in eastern Bulgarian lands, due to the social and cultural dominance of the Greek bourgeoisie. In the middle of the century, despite the opposition of Greek bishops, many Slav villages adopted the use of Bulgarian in education and liturgical life.

The 1870 firman establishing the Bulgarian Exarchate allowed for a diocese to join the Exarchate, given the support of 2/3 of its flock. Ecclesiastical allegiance was treated as a declaration of one's national identity. From 1870 until 1913 the national affiliation of the Orthodox Slavs of Macedonia became the locus of a contest between Greece and Bulgaria, who intensified their national educational activity in the region of Macedonia, alongside Serbia. In the 1870s, Serbs directed their attentions to Macedonia, due to their interest in the area of Kosovo and after the frustration of hopes of acquiring Bosnia-Herzegovina, once it was occupied by Austria-Hungary in 1878. Serbian intellectuals denied the Bulgarian identity of Macedonian Slavs, based on the differences between eastern and western Bulgarian dialects, and suggested they should be incorporated in Serbia. For Slav peasants, however, the choice between the Patriarchate and the Exarchate was not tainted with national meaning, but was a choice of Church or millet. Thus, adherence to the Bulgarian national cause was going against notions of the sanctity of the Greek language, but was attractive as a means of opposing oppressive Christian chiflik owners and urban merchants, who usually identified with the Greek nation, as a way to escape arbitrary taxation by Patriarchate bishops, via shifting allegiance to the Exarchate and on account of the free (and, occasionally, even subsidized) provision of education in Bulgarian schools. The Greek party initially relied on the traditional appeal of belonging to the Rum millet and the authority of its prelates, on Greek cultural and educational hegemony, and on cooperation with Ottoman authorities. Bulgarian nationalists had taken a lead, and as traditional means of exertion of influence by Greek nationalists proved insufficient, the Greek efforts after 1878 were directed to the middle and southern parts of Macedonia, investing in the opening of Greek schools and subsidizing education in Greece, while from 1882 Greece opened consulates that operated as centers of Greek national propaganda. Despite the emergence and propagation of national ideologies, the worldview of most Slav peasants in Macedonia  was marked by pre-national concerns, and characterized by the fundamental rift between Christian subjects and Muslim overlords.

Armed confrontation (1893–1908)

Towards the end of the nineteenth century living conditions of labourers in the chiftliks deteriorated, after their Turkish owners became indebted to Greek and Jewish merchants and sold their estates. while economic divisions in the free villages deepened between poor small landholders and the wealthier notables, known as "çorbacı", who usually allied with Turkish authorities and the Greek bishop and sided with the Greek party. Economic misery and political friction led many peasants to emigration to the New World or to neighbouring countries, especially Bulgaria, whence they returned proselytised to the national cause.

As prospects of social mobility cultivated by the expanded provision of education were frustrated, a number of teachers and urban professions influenced by socialist ideas formed in 1893 in Salonica a secret revolutionary organization aiming to gain political autonomy for the region of Macedonia. After some name changes, it became known as the "Internal Macedonian Revolutionary Organization", and oriented its energies towards engaging traditional brigands and peasants in building a network of parallel institutions in Slav Macedonian villages, facing Ottoman repression and employing means of terror to cement its base. IMRO gained a mass following of peasants who attached themselves to its cause for social reasons, reaping short-term benefits by upper social strata, thanks to threat of violence by armed IMRO bands, and enchanted by the long-term promise of social reform, in particular radical agrarian reform. Having gained a stronghold in the area and having received the promise of Bulgarian intervention, the IMRO staged an anti-Ottoman rebellion, centered around the wealthy free villages of Western Macedonia, on 20 July (O.S.) 1903. The rebellion was brutally suppressed by the Ottomans; tens of villages, mostly in the Manastir Vilayet, were razed to the ground and thousands of uninvolved peasants sought refuge to the mountains.

The passivity of Bulgaria during the Ilinden revolt fostered separatist tendencies within the IMRO and Bulgaria intensified its efforts to infiltrate and gain a hold of its clandestine network. Moreover, following the Murzsteg Agreement, article 3 of which stipulated the administrative reorganization with a view to a better grouping of different nationalities, the governments of both Greece and Bulgaria began to organize missions of armed nationalist guerrilla bands to Macedonia, composed mostly of Cretans in the Greek case. Most Greek-speaking villages remained uninvolved in the Macedonian Struggle, which developed as a confrontation between opposing national factions mostly within the Christian Slav-speaking communities of Macedonia, leading contemporary observers to describe it as a "civil war among Christians". The infighting tore apart these communities, as IMRO komitadjis and rival members of Greek bands were connected with social or even family ties. Under the pressure of armed nationalist bands, individuals and entire communities in the Slavic-speaking parts of Macedonia were obliged to repeatedly shift their stated national affiliation. Rejecting such criteria as language or race, the Greek view appealed to the "national consciousness" of non-Greeks. In practice, this translated to the Slav peasant's confessional affiliation to the Greek-Orthodox millet. Facing a population largely indifferent to national ideas, the employment of violent means by Greek guerrillas in a manner equally relentless to that of the IMRO bands managed to restrict IMRO terrorist activities.

Serbia offered material support to the Ilinden Uprising, and after its suppression, authorities in Belgrade sought but failed to negotiate with Bulgarian leaders on sending Serbian bands into Macedonia for combined action. A Serbian Committee also had funded small groups of chetniks, either self-organized or part of the Bulgarian revolutionary organizations active in Macedonia (IMRO and SMAC) in spring of 1904. Soon, hostility between the Bulgarian organizations and the Serbian Chetnik Organization began. With the failed idea of joint actions, and growing nationalism, the government in Belgrade took over the activities of the organization.

The Young Turk Revolution in 1908 imposed a temporary stop to all guerrilla actions in Macedonia.

Second Constitutional Era (1908–1912)

The Second Constitutional Era established shortly after the 1908 Young Turk Revolution led to the restoration of the constitution of 1876. After the Revolution armed factions laid down their arms and joined the legal struggle. The Bulgarian community founded the Peoples' Federative Party (Bulgarian Section) and the Union of the Bulgarian Constitutional Clubs and participated in Ottoman elections. Some prominent Ottoman Greeks and Serbs also served as Ottoman Parliamentary Deputies. Soon the Turkish nationalism came to grow, and the Young Turks sought to suppress the national aspirations of the various minorities in the Empire. During the Balkan Wars of 1912–13, the Ottoman Empire lost most of its European territories inhabited by Christian minorities.

According to Encyclopædia Britannica 1911 Edition,  at the beginning of the 20th century the Slavs constituted the majority of the population of Macedonia. There were 1,300,000 Orthodox Christians, 800,000 Muslims and 75,000 Jews, by a total population of ca. 2,200,000 people. The Slavs were 1,150,000, of which 1,000,000 were Orthodox. Whether the majority of the Orthodox Slavs considered themselves to be Bulgarians then is difficult to answer. Some authors maintain only the majority of those Slavs who had developed some national identity, felt themselves to be Bulgarians, others claim that most of all Macedonian Slavs saw themselves as Bulgarians, or at least were part of the Bulgarian community. As a whole the international observers viewed the majority of them as some kind Bulgarian.

Integration in nation-states

The partition of the Ottoman lands of the region of Macedonia between Balkan nation-states after the conclusion of the Balkan Wars (1912–1913) and World War I (1914–1918) left the area, divided mainly between Greece and Serbia (later Yugoslavia). As result part of the Slav inhabitants of the region emigrated to Bulgarian Macedonia. Others remained as a Slavic-speaking linguistic minority in Greek Macedonia. On the other hand, those in Vardar Macedonia were ceded to the Kingdom of Serbia. Many became a subject of process of forced Serbianisation in Serbia (later Kingdom of Yugoslavia), and  Hellenisation in Greece.

During the Paris Peace Conference of 1919, the Allies sanctioned Serbian control of Vardar Macedonia and accepted the belief that Macedonian Slavs there were in fact "Southern Serbs". The locals faced with the policy of forced serbianisation. Serbian authorities persecuted Bulgarian priests and teachers, forcing them to flee and replacing them by Serbian. Persons declaring Bulgarian identity were imprisoned or went into exile. In 1924 upon the League of Nations' demand, a bilateral Bulgarian-Greek agreement was signed, known as the Politis–Kalfov Protocol, recognizing the "Greek Slavophones" as Bulgarians and guaranteeing their protection. On February 2, 1925, the Greek parliament, claiming pressure from the Kingdom of Yugoslavia, which threatened to renounce the treaty about the Greek–Serbian Alliance of 1913, refused to ratify the agreement, that lasted until June 10, 1925. In 1927 the Mollov–Kafantaris population exchange agreement was signed and the bulk of the Slavic-speaking population in Greece was forced to leave for Bulgaria, and the Greeks of Bulgaria to Greece. Later the Greek governments began promulgating a policy of persecution of the use of Slavic dialects both in public and in private, as well of expressions of any cultural or ethnic distinctiveness. In this way the leading Bulgarian community in most of the area was reduced, either by population exchanges or by change of its ethnic identity.

See also

 Macedonian Bulgarians
 Macedonian nationalism
 Ethnic Macedonians

References

Footnotes

Bibliography

Slavs from the Ottoman Empire
Macedonia under the Ottoman Empire